Jonathan James Finley (born 1972) is a Professor of Physics at the Technical University of Munich in Garching, Germany, where he holds the Chair of Semiconductor Nanostructures and Quantum Systems. His focus is on quantum phenomena in semiconductor nanostructures, photonic materials, dielectric and metallic films, among others, for applications in quantum technology. At such, he made major contributions to the characterization and understanding of the optical, electronic and spintronic properties of quantum dots and wires both from group-IV (Si, SiGe, C) and II-VI materials and oxides (CdSe, ZnO).

Biography
Finley completed his study of physics at the University of Manchester (UK) (1989-1993) before graduating with a Ph. D at the University of Sheffield (1993-1997) in the group of Maurice S. Skolnick. He first joined the Walter Schottky Institute at the Technical University in Munich, in the group of Gerhard Abstreiter, with a Royal Society Fellowship, becoming the Director of the Nanostructure Photonics Group there in 2003, until 2013. In between, he also held the positions of Research Fellow at the University of Sheffield (1999-2000) and Visiting Fellow at the Max Planck Institute for Quantum Optics (2002-2003). Since 2013, he has held the chair of Semiconductor Nanostructures and Quantum Systems.

Awards and honours

 University of Manchester Prize for Physics (1990, 1991, 1992, 1993)
 Royal Society (London) Junior Fellowship (1998)
 Max Planck Society Research Fellowship (2002)
 DPG Walter Schottky Preis für Festkörperforschung (2007)
 ISCS Young Scientist Prize (2008)
 Golden Chalk (Teaching Award of the TUM Physics Student Council) (2008, 2011, 2012)

Key publications

References

External links
 
 Jonathan Finley publications indexed by Publons

Living people
1972 births
Academic staff of the Technical University of Munich
20th-century British physicists
21st-century German physicists
Nanophysicists
Optical physicists